This is a list of notable Oromo people.

Artists and historians

 Ali Birra – Artist
 Baalu Girma – Artist
 Bakri Sapalo – Historian and Artist
 Boonaa Mohammed – Poetry
 Elias Melka – Songwriter and Producer
 Hachalu Hundessa – Singer-songwriter
 Lemma Guya – Painter
 Shantam Shubissa – Singer-songwriter
 Thomas Gobena – Musician 
 Tilahun Gessesse – Artist
 Tsegaye Gabre-Medhin – Artist
 Yadesa Bojia – Graphic Designer and Artist

Athletes

 Abebe Bikila – Athlete
 Abebe Dinkesa
 Abebe Wakgira
 Abera Kuma
 Almaz Ayana – Athlete
 Asha Gigi
 Aselefech Mergia
 Atsede Bayisa
 Bekana Daba
 Belaynesh Oljira
 Bilisuma Shugi
 Bizunesh Urgesa
 Derartu Tulu – Athlete
 Deresse Mekonnen
 Deriba Merga
 Ejegayehu Dibaba
 Elfenesh Alemu
 Emebt Etea
 Fate Tola
 Fatuma Roba – Athlete
 Feyisa Lilesa – Athlete
 Firehiwot Tufa Dado
 Gelete Burka
 Genzebe Dibaba
 Gezahegne Abera 
 Gudisa Shentema
 Guye Adola
 Ibrahim Jeilan – 
 Imane Merga
 Kenenisa Bekele – Athlete
 Lelisa Desisa
 Lencho Skibba
 Mamo Wolde
 Mare Dibaba
 Meseret Defar
 Meseret Hailu
 Meseret Mengistu
 Mestawet Tufa
 Metiku Megersa
 Maryam Yusuf Jamal
 Mohammed Aman
 Netsanet Gudeta
 Sifan Hassan – Athlete
 Sileshi Sihine – 
 Tilahun Regassa
 Tariku Bekele
 Tamiru Demisse
 Tesfaye Tola
Tesfaye Abera
 Tiki Gelana
 Tirunesh Dibaba – Athlete
 Worku Bikila (born 1968), long distance runner
 Yacob Jarso
 Yomif Kejelcha –

Footballers

Adugna Deyas
Abdusalam Abas Ibrahim
Asrat Megersa Gobena
 Hayder Sherefa
 Ijoollee Deeggaa
 Andinnet Yaadataa
 Daani'eel Maammoo
 Mesud Mohammed
 Tokmac Nguen (Oromo Mother)

Humanitarians and businesspersons

 Abebech Gobena – humanitarian
 Agitu Ideo Gudeta – Farmer, entrepreneur, environmentalist
 Girma Wake – business executive 
 Juneidi Basha – businessman

Military personnel

 Abebe Aregai
 Taaddelee Kitilaa
 Guddataa Tasammaa Maammoo
 Alamnesh Biraanuu Obsaa
 Surraa Adinoo Hordofaa
 Sanaagaa Waacaalee
 Ali II of Yejju – De facto ruler of the Ethiopian Empire
 Balcha Safo
 Birhanu Jula Gelalcha
 Dori of Yejju
 Gobana Dacche
 HabteGiyorgis Dinagde Botera – Governor
 Jagama Kello
 Kumsa Diriba
 Mengistu Haile Mariam
 Merid Negussie
 Mulugeta Buli
 Mikael of Wollo
 Tafari Benti

Politicians

 Ababiya Abajobir
 Bulaa Oljirraa KumsaaBulchaa Deeggaa Makkoo 
 Abadula Gemeda
 Abdullahi Yousuf
 Abiy Ahmed Ali – Prime Minister of Ethiopia 
 Adanech Abebe 
 Addisu Arega Kitessa
 Alemayehu Atomsa
 Aster Mamo
 Awol Allo
 Bekele Gerba
 Birtukan Mideksa
 Birtukan Ayano Dadi 
 Bulcha Demeksa
 Dawud Ibsa Ayana
 Demitu Hambisa Bonsa
 Diriba Kuma
 Fisseha Adugna
 Gebisa Ejeta
 Getachew Jigi Demeksa
 Girma Wolde-Giorgis – President of Ethiopia
 Haile Fida
 Jawar Mohammed – Activist and member of OFC
 Jaarraa Abbaa Gadaa
 Junedin Sado
 Kuma Demeksa
 Ketema Yifru
 Lemma Megersa – Ethiopian Minister of Defense
 Lencho Letta
 Martha Kuwee Kumsa
 Meaza Ashenafi
 Mengistu Haile Mariam
 Merera Gudina
 Mohammed Rashad Abdulle
 Muktar Kedir
 Mulatu Teshome – President of Ethiopia
 Negasso Gidada - President of Ethiopia
 Negeri Lencho
 Seleshi Bekele
 Shimelis Abdisa
 Sinknesh Ejigu
 Solomon Areda
 Tadesse Birru
 Tafari Benti
 Takele Uma Banti
 Teferra Wolde-Semait
 Tesfaye Dinka
 Tesfaye Gebre Kidan
 Workneh Gebeyehu
 Yilma Deressa

Nationalists

 Ahmad Taqi Sheikh Mohammed Rashid – 
 Aster Ganno
 Baro Tumsa
 Kaasaahuun MirreessaaDooktor Ashannaafii Mirreessaa
 Elemo Qiltu – 
 Haile Fida– 
 Jaarraa Abbaa Gadaa –
 Kelbessa Negewo
 Tadesse Birru – 
 Waqo Gutu –

Other notable people

 Abba Jifar II 
 Abune Petros
 Alamaayyoo OljirraaGaanjii Dubbannaa
 Aklilu Lemma 
 Gebisa Ejeta 
 Gudina Tumsa 
 Lij Iyasu 
 Machbuba 
 Malik Ambar 
 Onesimos Nesib

References 

Oromo people 
Oromo people